WSRM may refer to:
 WSRM (FM), a radio station licensed to Rome, Georgia, United States
 Welsh Socialist Republican Movement
 Windows System Resource Manager
 WS-ReliableMessaging, a network protocol